The 2009–10 New Jersey Devils season was the 36th season for the National Hockey League franchise that was established on June 11, 1974, and 28th season since the franchise relocated from Colorado prior to the 1982–83 NHL season.

Off-season
On June 9, 2009, Brent Sutter resigned as head coach of the Devils to become the head coach of the Calgary Flames.

At the Entry Draft, the Devils traded with the Calgary Flames to move up in the draft and chose Jacob Josefson with the 20th overall pick.

On July 13, 2009, the Devils named Jacques Lemaire as their new head coach. This was Lemaire's 2nd stint with the club. He won the Stanley Cup as head coach of the Devils back in 1995.

Preseason

|- align="center" bgcolor="CCFFCC"
| 1 || September 16 || New York Rangers || 3–2 (SO) || Prudential Center – 10,481 || 1–0–0
|- align="center" bgcolor="CCFFCC"
| 2 || September 23 || New York Islanders || 4–2 || Nassau Veterans Memorial Coliseum – 8,256 || 2–0–0
|- align="center" bgcolor="BBBBBB"
| 3 || September 24 || Philadelphia Flyers || 1–2 (OT) || Wachovia Center – 17,650 || 2–0–1
|- align="center" bgcolor="CCFFCC"
| 4 || September 26 || Philadelphia Flyers || 1–0 || Prudential Center – 11,167 || 3–0–1
|- align="center" bgcolor="CCFFCC"
| 5 || September 29 || New York Islanders || 4–2 || Prudential Center – 10,311 || 4–0–1
|-

|

Regular season
The Devils allowed only 186 goals (excluding five shootout goals) during the regular season, the fewest of all 30 teams. They were also the most disciplined team in the NHL, with just 240 power-play opportunities against.

 December 21, 2009 - In a victory over the Pittsburgh Penguins, Martin Brodeur broke Terry Sawchuk's record for the most regular-season shutouts with his 104th career shutout.  Then, he shut out the Penguins again on December 30, 2009, earning him his 105th shutout, giving him the all-time professional record for most shutouts. 

 April 6, 2010 - In a victory over the Atlanta Thrashers, Martin Brodeur earned his 600th career win and 110th career shutout.

Divisional standings

Conference standings

Schedule and results

|- align="center" bgcolor="FFBBBB"
| 1 || October 3 || Philadelphia Flyers || 2–5 || Prudential Center – 17,625 || 0–1–0 || 0
|- align="center" bgcolor="FFBBBB"
| 2 || October 5 || New York Rangers || 2–3 || Prudential Center – 17,625 || 0–2–0 || 0
|- align="center" bgcolor="CCFFCC"
| 3 || October 8 || Tampa Bay Lightning || 4–3 (SO) || St. Pete Times Forum – 17,454 || 1–2–0 || 2
|- align="center" bgcolor="CCFFCC"
| 4 || October 10 || Florida Panthers || 3–2 || BankAtlantic Center – 18,802 || 2–2–0 || 4
|- align="center" bgcolor="CCFFCC"
| 5 || October 12 || Washington Capitals || 3–2 (SO) || Verizon Center – 18,277 || 3–2–0 || 6
|- align="center" bgcolor="FFBBBB"
| 6 || October 16 || Atlanta Thrashers || 2–4 || Prudential Center – 14,187 || 3–3–0 || 6
|- align="center" bgcolor="CCFFCC"
| 7 || October 17 || Carolina Hurricanes || 2–0 || Prudential Center – 15,021 || 4–3–0 || 8
|- align="center" bgcolor="CCFFCC"
| 8 || October 22 || New York Rangers || 4–2 || Madison Square Garden – 18,200  || 5–3–0 || 10
|- align="center" bgcolor="CCFFCC"
| 9 || October 24 || Pittsburgh Penguins || 4–1 || Mellon Arena – 17,132 || 6–3–0 || 12
|- align="center" bgcolor="FFBBBB"
| 10 || October 28 || Buffalo Sabres || 1–4 || Prudential Center – 14,182 || 6–4–0 || 12
|- align="center" bgcolor="CCFFCC"
| 11 || October 29 || Boston Bruins || 2–1 || TD Garden – 17,565 || 7–4–0 || 14
|- align="center" bgcolor="CCFFCC"
| 12 || October 31 || Tampa Bay Lightning || 2–1 (SO) || St. Pete Times Forum – 12,154 || 8–4–0 || 16
|-

|- align="center" bgcolor="CCFFCC"
| 13 || November 4 || Washington Capitals || 3–2 || Prudential Center – 13,498 || 9–4–0 || 18
|- align="center" bgcolor="CCFFCC"
| 14 || November 6 || New York Islanders || 2–1 || Prudential Center – 14,109  || 10–4–0 || 20
|- align="center" bgcolor="CCFFCC"
| 15 || November 7 || Ottawa Senators || 3–2 || Scotiabank Place – 18,781 || 11–4–0 || 22
|- align="center" bgcolor="CCFFCC"
| 16 || November 11 || Anaheim Ducks || 3–1 || Prudential Center – 14,123 || 12–4–0 || 24
|- align="center" bgcolor="CCFFCC"
| 17 || November 12 || Pittsburgh Penguins || 4–1 || Mellon Arena – 17,005 || 13–4–0 || 26
|- align="center" bgcolor="CCFFCC"
| 18 || November 14 || Washington Capitals || 5–2 || Prudential Center – 16,521 || 14–4–0 || 28
|- align="center" bgcolor="FFBBBB"
| 19 || November 16 || Philadelphia Flyers || 2–3 || Wachovia Center – 19,673 || 14–5–0 || 28
|- align="center" bgcolor="BBBBBB"
| 20 || November 19 || Nashville Predators || 2–3 (SO) || Sommet Center – 13,445 || 14–5–1 || 29
|- align="center" bgcolor="FFBBBB"
| 21 || November 21 || Dallas Stars || 3–5 || American Airlines Center – 17,514 || 14–6–1 || 29
|- align="center" bgcolor="CCFFCC"
| 22 || November 25 || Ottawa Senators || 3–1 || Prudential Center – 14,056 || 15–6–1 || 31
|- align="center" bgcolor="CCFFCC"
| 23 || November 27 || Boston Bruins || 2–1 (SO) || TD Garden – 17,565 || 16–6–1 || 33
|- align="center" bgcolor="CCFFCC"
| 24 || November 28 || New York Islanders || 6–1 || Prudential Center – 16,961 || 17–6–1 || 35
|-

|- align="center" bgcolor="FFBBBB"
| 25 || December 2 || Vancouver Canucks || 2–5 || Prudential Center – 13,586 || 17–7–1 || 35
|- align="center" bgcolor="CCFFCC"
| 26 || December 4 || Tampa Bay Lightning || 3–2 || Prudential Center – 15,336 || 18–7–1 || 37
|- align="center" bgcolor="CCFFCC"
| 27 || December 5 || Detroit Red Wings || 4–3 (SO) || Prudential Center – 17,625 || 19–7–1 || 39
|- align="center" bgcolor="CCFFCC"
| 28 || December 7 || Buffalo Sabres || 3–0 || HSBC Arena – 18,690 || 20–7–1 || 41
|- align="center" bgcolor="CCFFCC"
| 29 || December 9 || Carolina Hurricanes || 4–2 || Prudential Center – 12,013 || 21–7–1 || 43
|- align="center" bgcolor="FFBBBB"
| 30 || December 11 || Florida Panthers || 2–4 || Prudential Center – 14,132  || 21–8–1 || 43
|- align="center" bgcolor="CCFFCC"
| 31 || December 12 || Philadelphia Flyers || 4–1 || Prudential Center – 15,724 || 22–8–1 || 45
|- align="center" bgcolor="CCFFCC"
| 32 || December 16 || Montreal Canadiens || 2–1 || Prudential Center – 12,178 || 23–8–1 || 47
|- align="center" bgcolor="CCFFCC"
| 33 || December 18 || Ottawa Senators || 4–2 || Prudential Center – 13,728|| 24–8–1 || 49
|- align="center" bgcolor="CCFFCC"
| 34 || December 19 || Atlanta Thrashers || 5–4 || Philips Arena – 14,616 || 25–8–1 || 51
|- align="center" bgcolor="CCFFCC"
| 35 || December 21 || Pittsburgh Penguins || 4–0 || Mellon Arena – 17,132 || 26–8–1 || 53
|- align="center" bgcolor="FFBBBB"
| 36 || December 26 || Washington Capitals || 1–4 || Verizon Center – 18,277 || 26–9–1 || 53
|- align="center" bgcolor="CCFFCC"
| 37 || December 28 || Atlanta Thrashers || 3–2 || Prudential Center – 17,024 || 27–9–1 || 55
|- align="center" bgcolor="CCFFCC"
| 38 || December 30 || Pittsburgh Penguins || 2–0 || Prudential Center – 17,625 || 28–9–1 || 57
|- align="center" bgcolor="FFBBBB"
| 39 || December 31 || Chicago Blackhawks || 1–5 || United Center – 21,614|| 28–10–1 || 57
|-

|- align="center" bgcolor="CCFFCC"
| 40 || January 2 || Minnesota Wild || 5–3 || Xcel Energy Center – 19,155 || 29–10–1 || 59
|- align="center" bgcolor="CCFFCC"
| 41 || January 5 || Dallas Stars || 4–0 || Prudential Center – 14,202 || 30–10–1 || 61
|- align="center" bgcolor="FFBBBB"
| 42 || January 8/10 || Tampa Bay Lightning || 2–4 || Prudential Center – 15,129 || 30–11–1 || 61
|- align="center" bgcolor="CCFFCC"
| 43 || January 9 || Montreal Canadiens || 2–1 (OT)|| Bell Centre – 21,273 || 31–11–1 || 63
|- align="center" bgcolor="CCFFCC"
| 44 || January 12 || New York Rangers || 1–0 (SO) || Madison Square Garden – 18,200 || 32–11–1 || 65
|- align="center" bgcolor="FFBBBB"
| 45 || January 14 || Phoenix Coyotes || 3–4 || Jobing.com Arena – 9,430 || 32–12–1 || 65
|- align="center" bgcolor="FFBBBB"
| 46 || January 16 || Colorado Avalanche || 1–3 || Pepsi Center – 17,816 || 32–13–1 || 65
|- align="center" bgcolor="FFBBBB"
| 47 || January 18 || New York Islanders || 0–4 || Nassau Veterans Memorial Coliseum – 16,250 || 32–14–1 || 65
|- align="center" bgcolor="CCFFCC"
| 48 || January 20 || Florida Panthers || 2–0 || Prudential Center – 13,931 || 33–14–1 || 67
|- align="center" bgcolor="FFBBBB"
| 49 || January 22 || Montreal Canadiens || 1–3 || Prudential Center – 17,625 || 33–15–1 || 67
|- align="center" bgcolor="CCFFCC"
| 50 || January 23 || New York Islanders || 4–2 || Nassau Veterans Memorial Coliseum – 16,250 || 34–15–1 || 69
|- align="center" bgcolor="FFBBBB"
| 51 || January 26 || Ottawa Senators || 0–3 || Scotiabank Place – 18,107 || 34–16–1 || 69
|- align="center" bgcolor="BBBBBB"
| 52 || January 27 || Buffalo Sabres || 1–2 (SO) || HSBC Arena –  18,690 || 34–16–2 || 70
|- align="center" bgcolor="CCFFCC"
| 53 || January 29 || Toronto Maple Leafs || 5–4 (OT) || Prudential Center – 15,536 || 35–16–2 || 72
|- align="center" bgcolor="FFBBBB"
| 54 || January 31 || Los Angeles Kings || 2–3 || Prudential Center – 17,625 || 35–17–2 || 72
|-

|- align="center" bgcolor="FFBBBB"
| 55 || February 2 || Toronto Maple Leafs || 0–3 || Air Canada Centre – 19,326 || 35–18–2 || 72
|- align="center" bgcolor="CCFFCC"
| 56 || February 5 || Toronto Maple Leafs || 4–3 || Prudential Center – 15,204 || 36–18–2 || 74
|- align="center" bgcolor="FFBBBB"
| 57 || February 6 || New York Rangers || 1–3 || Madison Square Garden – 18,200 || 36–19–2 || 74
|- align="center" bgcolor="FFBBBB"
| 58 || February 8 || Philadelphia Flyers || 2–3 || Wachovia Center – 19,678 || 36–20–2 || 74
|- align="center" bgcolor="BBBBBB"
| 59 || February 10 || Philadelphia Flyers || 2–3 (OT) || Prudential Center – 5,580 || 36–20–3 || 75
|- align="center" bgcolor="CCFFCC"
| 60 || February 12 || Nashville Predators || 5–2 || Prudential Center – 17,625 || 37–20–3 || 77
|- align="center" bgcolor="FFBBBB"
| 61 || February 13 || Carolina Hurricanes || 2–5 || RBC Center – 16,466 || 37–21–3 || 77
|-

|- align="center" bgcolor="CCFFCC"
| 62 || March 2 || San Jose Sharks || 4–3 || HP Pavilion – 17,562 || 38–21–3 || 79
|- align="center" bgcolor="FFBBBB"
| 63 || March 5 || Calgary Flames || 3–5 || Pengrowth Saddledome – 19,289 || 38–22–3 ||  79
|- align="center" bgcolor="FFBBBB"
| 64 || March 7 || Edmonton Oilers || 0–2 || Rexall Place – 16,839 || 38–23–3 || 79
|- align="center" bgcolor="CCFFCC"
| 65 || March 10 || New York Rangers || 6–3 || Prudential Center – 17,625 || 39–23–3 || 81
|- align="center" bgcolor="CCFFCC"
| 66 || March 12 || Pittsburgh Penguins || 3–1 || Prudential Center – 17,625 || 40–23–3 || 83
|- align="center" bgcolor="FFBBBB"
| 67 || March 13 || New York Islanders || 2–4 || Nassau Veterans Memorial Coliseum – 15,583 || 40–24–3 || 83
|- align="center" bgcolor="CCFFCC"
| 68 || March 15 || Boston Bruins || 3–2 || Prudential Center – 15,801 || 41–24–3 || 85
|- align="center" bgcolor="CCFFCC"
| 69 || March 17 || Pittsburgh Penguins || 5–2 || Prudential Center – 17,625 || 42–24–3 || 87
|- align="center" bgcolor="BBBBBB"
| 70 || March 18 || Toronto Maple Leafs || 1–2 (SO) || Air Canada Centre – 19,183 || 42–24–4 || 88
|- align="center" bgcolor="FFBBBB"
| 71 || March 20 || St. Louis Blues || 0–1 || Prudential Center – 17,625 || 42–25–4 || 88
|- align="center" bgcolor="CCFFCC"
| 72 || March 23 || Columbus Blue Jackets || 6–3 || Prudential Center – 14,202 || 43–25–4 || 90
|- align="center" bgcolor="BBBBBB"
| 73 || March 25 || New York Rangers || 3–4 (SO) || Prudential Center – 17,625 || 43–25–5 || 91
|- align="center" bgcolor="CCFFCC"
| 74 || March 27 || Montreal Canadiens || 4–2 || Bell Centre – 21,273 || 44–25–5 || 93
|- align="center" bgcolor="FFBBBB"
| 75 || March 28 || Philadelphia Flyers || 1–5 || Wachovia Center – 19,769 || 44–26–5 || 93
|- align="center" bgcolor="BBBBBB"
| 76 || March 30 || Boston Bruins || 0–1 (OT) || Prudential Center – 16,636 || 44–26–6 || 94
|-

|- align="center" bgcolor="BBBBBB"
| 77 || April 2 || Chicago Blackhawks || 1–2 (SO) || Prudential Center – 17,625 || 44–26–7 || 95
|- align="center" bgcolor="CCFFCC"
| 78 || April 3 || Carolina Hurricanes || 4–0 || RBC Center – 16,073 || 45–26–7 || 97
|- align="center" bgcolor="CCFFCC"
| 79 || April 6 || Atlanta Thrashers || 3–0 || Philips Arena – 12,038 || 46–26–7 || 99
|- align="center" bgcolor="FFBBBB"
| 80 || April 8 || Florida Panthers || 2–3 || BankAtlantic Center – 15,273 || 46–27–7 || 99
|- align="center" bgcolor="CCFFCC"
| 81 || April 10 || New York Islanders || 7–1 || Prudential Center – 17,625 || 47–27–7 || 101
|- align="center" bgcolor="CCFFCC"
| 82 || April 11 || Buffalo Sabres || 2–1 || Prudential Center – 17,625 || 48–27–7 || 103
|-

|-
| 2009–10 schedule

Lighting incident
On January 8, 2010, a lighting problem occurred in the arena during a game between the Devils and the Tampa Bay Lightning. Tampa Bay was leading 3–0 with 9:12 left in the second period when half of the sports lights went out due to an interruption in power on the grid feeding electricity to the arena, followed by a failure of a computer-operated lighting system that allowed the sports lighting system to function with the circuit breakers. PSE&G and Prudential Center electricians worked on the situation for 1 hour and 52 minutes but could not reboot the system. The game was suspended due to the lighting problem; it was resumed two nights later, with about 3,000 of the original crowd of 15,129 in attendance. The Devils, Tampa Bay Lightning and the NHL agreed to waive a rule prohibiting players from participating in an NHL-sanctioned event on three consecutive nights as per the NHL Collective Bargaining Agreement. Tampa Bay won, 4–2, with Lightning center Steven Stamkos scoring two goals in the contest: one on Friday and one on Sunday.

Playoffs

With their win on March 27, 2010, against the Montreal Canadiens at Bell Centre, the Devils clinched a playoff berth and participated in the Stanley Cup playoffs for the 13th consecutive season and for the 20th time in 22 seasons.

Player statistics

Skaters
Note: GP = Games played; G = Goals; A = Assists; Pts = Points; +/− = Plus/Minus; PIM = Penalty minutes

Goaltenders

†Denotes player spent time with another team before joining Devils. Stats reflect time with Devils only.
‡Traded mid-season. Stats reflect time with Devils only.

Awards and records

Awards

Nominations

Records

Milestones

Transactions

Trades

Free agents acquired

Free agents lost

Lost via waivers

Lost via retirement

Player signings

Draft picks

New Jersey's picks at the 2009 NHL Entry Draft in Montreal, Quebec.

Farm teams
The Lowell Devils of the American Hockey League and the Trenton Devils of the ECHL remain the New Jersey Devils' minor league affiliates for the 2009–10 season.

See also
 2009–10 NHL season

References

External links
2009–10 New Jersey Devils season at ESPN
2009–10 New Jersey Devils season at Hockey Reference

New Jersey Devils seasons
New Jersey Devils
New Jersey Devils
New Jersey Devils
New Jersey Devils
21st century in Newark, New Jersey